Bouwman is a Dutch occupational surname meaning farmer or gardener. It may refer to:

Corry Vreeken-Bouwman (b. 1928), Dutch chess player
 (b. 1943), Dutch model and fashion designer
Harry Bouwman (b. 1953), Dutch Information systems researcher
Henk Bouwman (1926–1995), Dutch field hockey player, father of Roderik
Jan Bouwman (1935–1999), Dutch swimmer
Koen Bouwman (b. 1993), Dutch racing cyclist
Mies Bouwman (1929–2018), Dutch television host
Pim Bouwman (b. 1991), Dutch football midfielder
Roderik Bouwman (b. 1957), Dutch field hockey player, son of Henk
 (b. 1947), Dutch GreenLeft politician
Bouwmans:
Eddy Bouwmans (b. 1968), Dutch racing cyclist

See also
Bouman (disambiguation)

References

Dutch-language surnames
Occupational surnames